The Welsh Association of Sub Aqua Clubs (WASAC) was the national governing body (NGB) for Sub Aqua in Wales until January 2016. Sub Aqua is a broad term encompassing both recreational underwater activities such as recreational diving and snorkelling, and competitive underwater activities including underwater sports as underwater hockey

The WASAC was one of four NGBs representing Sub Aqua in the constituent countries of the United Kingdom. The others are the Northern Ireland Federation of Sub-Aqua Clubs (Northern Ireland) and the Scottish Sub Aqua Club (Scotland), in addition to the British Sub Aqua Club, the NGB for the whole United Kingdom; a role it has held since 1954.

Although WASAC was responsible for underwater hockey (also known as Octopush), training and management of Wales national squads is controlled by Underwater Hockey Wales (UHW).

The WASAC was based at Gwaun-Cae-Gurwen, Neath Port Talbot.

The WASAC was replaced by the British Sub Aqua Club as the governing body for Sub Aqua in Wales from January 2016.

See also
 List of sports governing bodies in Wales

References

External links
 

Diving organizations
Sub Aqua
Underwater diving in the United Kingdom
Water sports in Wales